Philip Heckman Arbuckle (September 6, 1882 – June 11, 1932) was an American football, basketball, and baseball coach and college athletics administrator. He served as the head football coach at Southwestern University in Georgetown, Texas from 1908 to 1911, Rice University from 1912 to 1917 and 1919 to 1923, and Louisiana Tech University in 1924, compiling a career college football coaching record of 60–44–14. At Rice he tallied a 51–25–8 record. His 1919 team went 8–1, to mark his best season. His only losing season at Rice came in 1923. In 1924, he coached at Louisiana Tech, where he compiled a 1–6–1 record.

Arbuckle died in Houston, Texas on June 11, 1932, of a pulmonary embolism caused by subacute bacterial endocarditis.

Rice University
Arbuckle served as Rice University's first athletic director and football coach in 1912. His teams played against local high schools until Rice joined the Southwest Conference in 1914. Arbuckle also served as the head coach of the baseball, basketball and track teams and taught English and history. He was succeeded by John Heisman in 1924 and inducted into the Rice Athletic Hall of Fame in 1975.

Head coaching record

Football

Basketball

Baseball

See also
 List of college football head coaches with non-consecutive tenure

References

External links
 

1882 births
1932 deaths
Basketball coaches from Illinois
Louisiana Tech Bulldogs football coaches
Rice Owls athletic directors
Rice Owls baseball coaches
Rice Owls football coaches
Rice Owls men's basketball coaches
Southwestern Pirates athletic directors
Southwestern Pirates baseball coaches
Southwestern Pirates football coaches
Southwestern Pirates men's basketball coaches
Sportspeople from the Chicago metropolitan area
University of Chicago alumni
People from Belvidere, Illinois
People from DeKalb County, Illinois
Deaths from endocarditis
Deaths from pulmonary embolism